Stephen Heywood (April 13, 1969 – November 26, 2006) was an American builder and self-taught architect, specializing in the renovation of old houses.

He was diagnosed with ALS in 1998, at the age of 29. He was the subject of His Brother's Keeper: A Story from the Edge of Medicine, written by the Pulitzer Prize-winning author Jonathan Weiner, and the documentary film So Much So Fast, which premiered at the 2006 Sundance Film Festival.

His brothers James Heywood and Benjamin Heywood are co-founders of a website for patients with ALS and other life-changing illnesses, PatientsLikeMe; his father is the engineering professor John B. Heywood.

Heywood lived in Newton, Massachusetts, with his wife and son until his death at age 37 from an accidentally detached respirator in November 2006.

References

External links
So Much So Fast Frontline
PatientsLikeMe.com, a website for patients with ALS and other life-altering conditions, set up by Stephen's brothers Jamie and Ben Heywood

1969 births
2006 deaths
Deaths from motor neuron disease
Neurological disease deaths in Massachusetts
People from Newton, Massachusetts
Place of birth missing
Place of death missing